Shilong may refer to:

Shilong District, in Pingdingshan, Henan, China
Shilong, Guangdong, a town in Dongguan, Guangdong, China
Shilong, Hubei, a town in Jingshan County, Jingmen, Hubei
Shilong Road station, station on the Shanghai Metro Line 3
Shilong Temple, Tudigong temple in Zhongliao, Nantou, Taiwan

See also
 Shiling (disambiguation)
Shillong, capital of Meghalaya, India